The Kaifeng Jews (Yahădūt Qāʾyfeng) are members of a small community of descendants of Chinese Jews in Kaifeng, in the Henan province of China. In the early centuries of their settlement, they may have numbered around 2,500 people. Despite their isolation from the rest of the Jewish diaspora, their ancestors managed to practice Jewish traditions and customs for several centuries.

The distinctive customary life of the Kaifeng community slowly eroded, as assimilation and intermarriage with Han Chinese and Chinese Muslim neighbors advanced, until, by the 19th century, its Jewishness largely became extinct, apart from its retention of memories of its clan's Jewish past.

The place of origin of these Jews and the date when they established their settlement in Kaifeng are sources of intense debate among experts. While the descendants of the Kaifeng Jews are assimilated into mainstream Chinese culture, some of them are trying to revive the beliefs and customs of their ancestors. In the 21st century, efforts have been made to revive Kaifeng's Jewish heritage and encourage the descendants of its original population to convert back to Judaism. Several have undertaken to qualify for aliyah and relocate to Israel.

History

Background
The origin of the Kaifeng Jews and the date of their arrival is one of the most intensely debated topics in the field of Chinese-Jewish relations. Though some scholars date their arrival to the Tang Dynasty (618–907), or even earlier, Steven Sharot, reflecting the majority view, considers that the most probable date for the formation of a Jewish community in Kaifeng was sometime during the Song dynasty (960-1279). That prior to the Song, Jewish merchants were active in China appears probable from the fact that the Eastern Islamic Persian geographer Ibn Khordadbeh in his Book of Roads and Kingdoms (Kitāb al-Masālik wa-l-Mamālik) ca. 870 describes the Jewish Radhanite merchants as operating over a wide arc from Western Europe to China.  It has been conjectured that this group constituted the first of two waves of Jewish settlement in China, the second being associated with the Mongol conquest and the establishment of the Yuan dynasty.

According to a scholarly consensus, the Jewish community of Kaifeng primarily consisted of people of Persian Jewish origin. Uncertainty persists as to whether they came overland through Chang'an, via either of the two Silk Roads, or whether they travelled inland after they reached coastal cities like Canton/Khānfū or Quanzhou/Zaitun by sea. Ibn Khordadbeh's Rhadanites used both routes. Some evidence has been interpreted to suggest that their ancestors may have mostly hailed from the Bukharan Jewish branch of Persian Jews who had settled in Central Asia. In all likelihood, all of the founders of the community were male Jewish merchants: the arduous, dangerous nature of the route, and the length of time which they needed to spend in order to travel on it, would have probably forced them to rule out bringing their wives, and after they settled in Kaifeng, they married Chinese women.

With regard to this first wave, among the vast trove of documents which Aurel Stein discovered in Dunhuang in Gansu, northwestern China, was a bill of sale for sheep which dated back to 718 CE, written in Judeo-Persian with Hebrew characters, they wrote their documents on paper, something which was unavailable in the West, together with a fragment of a Seliḥoth which was probably composed in the eighth or ninth century. A century later, the Arab geographer Abū Zayd Ḥasan al-Sīrāfī mentioned (910) a massacre which occurred in Canton in 878/9 in which not only Muslims and Christians but Jews were also killed, attesting to the latter group's presence in China. Trade with China was predominantly maritime, and dominated by Arabs, with many Jews also engaged in this network. By the 11th century, more than a million Arabs lived in port enclaves, where they were allowed self-administration. At least 7 synagogue communities are attested for this period in all major Chinese port cities, such as Yangzhou, Ningbo and Hangzhou. Goods from these coastal centres were transported inland via the Grand Canal to the Yellow River and then by barge to Kaifeng. The Jewish community that was eventually established in Kaifeng survived the collapse of these sister communities on the eastern seaboard, all of which disappeared in the 15-16th centuries when the Ming dynasty's ability to protect its coast was crippled by constant raiding from Japanese pirates.

The Song/Yuan period hypotheses
The point of departure for determining precisely when a community (kehillah) was established relies on two forms of evidence: the information surviving in inscriptions from four stelae recovered from Kaifeng, and references in Chinese dynastic sources. The dates on the stelae range from 1489 through 1512 and 1663 to 1679. Chinese documents on Jews are rare compared to the voluminous records of other peoples. The first official documents referring to Jews as a distinct group date to the Yuan dynasty.

Two Chinese scholars have argued that the Jews went to China in 998, because the Song History records that in the year 998, a monk (僧) named Ni-wei-ni (你尾尼:Nǐ wěi ní) and others had spent seven years traveling from India to China in order to pay homage to the Song Emperor Zhenzong. They identified this Ni-wei-ni as a Jewish rabbi. Others followed this up with a claim that the Song History provides a precise date for a large population of Jewish expatriates accompanying Ni-wei-ni from India who putatively arrived in Kaifeng on 20 February 998. These inferences contradict Buddhist records for Ni-wei-ni's visit.  Both the sēng used to describe Ni-wei-ni in the Song dynastic history and the shāmén in the Buddha Almanac of Zhi-pan mean "Buddhist monk", not rabbi. Furthermore, Ni-wei-ni did not bring Western cloth with him, but banyan seeds.

The earliest stele erected by the Kaifeng community bears the date 1489. This, it is affirmed, commemorates the construction in 1163 of a synagogue called Qingzhensi (清真寺:qīngzhēnsì, "True and pure Temple"), the customary term for mosques in China.   The inscription states that the Jews came to China from Tiānzhú (天竺), a Han-Song term for India. It adds that they brought Western cloth as tribute for an emperor, unnamed, who welcomed them with the words:"You have come to Our China; reverence and preserve the customs of your ancestors, and hand them down at Bianliang (汴梁:Biànliáng)," i.e., Kaifeng. The same stone inscription also associates the building's establishment with two names: An-du-la (俺都喇:Ăndūlǎ perhaps 'Abdullah") and a certain Lieh-wei (列微:Liè wēi), probably transcribing Levi, who is described as the Wu-ssu-ta (五思達:Wǔsīdá) of the community. This last term probably is a phonetic rendering of the Persian word ustad, ("master", religious leader), and "rabbi" in a Jewish context in that language.

At this time northern China was ruled by the Jurchan Jin dynasty (金朝:Jīncháo (1115–1234)), while the area south of the Yangtze river was controlled by the Southern Song. Irene Eber, among others, assumes that this context suggests that the Kaifeng Jews must have settled in this Song capital, then known as Bianjing, no later than 1120, some years before the Song-Jin alliance broke down. It was in 1127 during the subsequent Jin–Song Wars that Kaifeng was captured as a result of the Jingkang incident (靖康事變:Jìngkāng shìbiàn). By 1163, when the synagogue is thought to have been established, Kaifeng had been occupied by the Jurchen for 37/38 years: and had been their capital since 1161. The 1489 stele speaks of its establishment coinciding with the first year of the Longxing (隆興: Lóngxīng) era of the Song emperor Xiaozong (孝宗::Xiàozōng), namely 1161, which sets the synagogue's establishment in the first year of the reign of the Jurchen Emperor Jin Shizong(金世宗:Jīn Shìzōng), within whose territory Kaifeng lay.  If the city was Jurchen, it is asked, why does the stele associate its foundation with the Song?

Recently, Peng Yu has challenged the Song-entry consensus, favouring instead a variant of the "second wave" theory of Kaifeng Jewish origins, one version of which holds that Jews probably figured among the large number of peoples collectively known as the Semu (色目人:sèmùrén) who were captured during Mongol campaigns in the West and conveyed east to serve in the bureaucracy and assist the Mongols in administering China after its conquest. The two names associated in 1489 with the establishment of the synagogue in 1163, An-du-la and Lieh-wei (namely Abdullah and Levi), are in Yu's interpretation retrodated from later times. An-du-la, on the basis of the 1679 stele, he reads as the religious name of the An Cheng (俺誠:Ăn Chéng), said to be a Kaifeng Jewish physician, who "restored" the synagogue in 1421 (not 1163). According to the Diary of the Defence of Pien, the Kaifeng Jewish Li/Levi clan, from whose ranks some 14 manla or synagogue leaders were drawn, only arrived in Kaifeng after relocating from Beijing during the Hung Wu Period (1368–98) of the Ming Dynasty.

Yu's Yuan-entry theory claims that the Kaifeng Jews entered China together with the Muslim Hui-hui people during the Mongol Yuan Dynasty. The Jews themselves were defined as a Hui people, due to similarities between Jewish and Islamic traditions. They were called blue hat Hui (藍帽回回:lánmào huíhuí) as opposed to the "white cap Hui" (白帽回回:báimào huíhuí), who were Muslims. Chinese sources do not mention the existence of Chinese Jews until the Mongol Yuan Dynasty.

The explanation for these contradictions within the various stelae must lie, Yu thinks, in the impact of Ming imperial policies aiming to constrain peoples such as the Semu, who came en masse with the Mongols peoples, to assimilate to the culture of the revived Han hegemony. The dynasty was marked by a distinct anti-foreign sentiment expressed in coercive decrees that enforced assimilation, and therefore, Yu infers, the Kaifeng Jews, under the Ming, claimed in their monumental stone inscriptions that their roots in China were ancient, going back at least to the nativist Song if not indeed to the Han period.  The stele sought to assert proof of a long accommodation by Jews to Chinese civilization in order to avoid discriminatory measures.

The early Kaifeng community
Kaifeng was a cosmopolitan industrial metropolis with 600,000 to a million inhabitants in Northern Song times, which formed an intense hub for overland trade via the Silk Road and the commercial riverine networks connecting it to the eastern seabord. Through it vast amounts of grain tribute also passed. Its strategic importance and wealth were recognized by successive dynastic powers over the period 905–959, such as the Liang (who gave it its present name), Jin, Later Han and Later Zhou who all made it their capital, as did the Northern Song when they unified the empire, until the city was conquered by the Jurchen in 1127. Under siege, it surrendered to the Mongols in 1233. It would have been attractive to Persian Jewish merchants. The founding colony's members may have specialized in the manufacturing, dyeing, or pattern printing of cotton fabrics. By the early 16th century, an inscription mentions not only craftsmen, farmers and traders among them, but also scholars, physicians and officials, political and administrative, as well as military men in important posts.

A Ming emperor conferred eight surnames upon the Jews. Other evidence points to 70-73 surnames. The late 1672 inscription states that at the synagogue's inception (1163) there were 73 clans (姓:xìng) and 500 families (家:jiā) in the Kaifeng Jewish community. The Hongzhi stele (1489) (弘治碑:hóngzhìbēi) registers the names of 14 clans.
 Ài (艾) (Heb.צי)
 Shí (石) (Heb.שה)
 Gāo (高)
 Mù (穆)
 Bái (白)
 Huáng (黄)
 Zhào (赵/趙) (Heb.שי)
 Zhōu (周)
 Zuǒ (左)
 Niè (聂/聶)
 Jin (金) (Heb.גין)
 Lǐ (李) (Heb.לי)
 Ăn (俺)
 Zhāng (張)(Heb.גך)

Leaders among this community were called manla(暪喇:mánlǎ), a term usually explained as a loanword from Arabic mullah. It has been suggested however that it may well have been a phonetic transcription of the Hebrew ma'lā (מעלה) "the honourable".

The Persian rubrics of the Kaifeng Jewish liturgy are written in the Bukharan dialect and the Bukharan Jews believe that in the past, some of their kin migrated to China and ceased to have contact with their country of origin. Many of the known Hebrew names of the Kaifeng Jews were only found among Persian and Babylonian Jews. Jewish written sources do not mention how the Jews arrived in Kaifeng, though a legend says that they arrived by land on the Silk Road.

Some Jesuit reports inaccurately stated the Kaifeng Jews did not intermarry. The Ming dynasty (1368–1644), in reaction to the foreign dynasty it replaced, laid down a policy of discrimination against foreigners, such as the resident Mongols and Semu. Laws regarding ethnic endogamy were issued that forbade members of such communities from marrying within their own groups. They were at liberty to marry only Han Chinese. Failure to do so would lead to enslavement. To what degree these measures were applied is unknown, but is evident from their Memorial Book that intermarriage took place on a large scale among the Kaifeng Jews certainly from Ming and it may be assumed, in Qing times.  From the 19th century onwards it became the norm. They followed the Chinese custom of foot binding. The custom of the levirate marriage was retained, and polygamy was practiced: one Kaifeng Jew, the Zhang (張) clan's Zhang Mei, is recorded in the Memorial Book as having six wives, while Jin Rong-Zhang from the Jin clan (金) had five.

Towards the end of the Ming period, calculations based on the community's memorial book suggest that the Kaifeng Jewish community amounted to some 4,000 people. The catastrophic flood of 1642 brought about a precipitous drop in their population, to around 1,000 souls. The flood also destroyed the synagogue. Considerable efforts were made to save the scriptures. One man of the Gao clan, Gao Xuan, dove repeatedly into the flooded synagogue to rescue what he could and afterward all seven clans helped restore and rewrite the 13 scrolls. They obtained some from Ningxia and Ningbo to replace them, and another Hebrew Torah scroll was bought from a Muslim in Ningqiangzhou (in Shaanxi), who acquired it from a dying Jew at Canton.

Religious practices and beliefs

When Kaifeng Jews introduced themselves to the Jesuits in 1605, they called themselves members of the house of "Israel" (一賜樂業:Yīcìlèyè) The Jesuits also noted that a Chinese exonym labelled them as Tiao jin jiao, "the sect that plucks the sinews" (挑筋教:Tiāojīn jiāo). This term arose from observing that, in memory of Jacob's wrestling with the angel, their butchers extracted the sciatic nerve (Gid hanasheh) as required in Nikkur, marking them as distinct from Muslims who otherwise, like them, also refrained from eating pork."

The evidence on the stelae shows that they identified the emergence of Judaism as coinciding with the early Zhou Dynasty (ca.  1046–256 BCE, in modern reckoning). Abraham (阿無羅漢:Āwúluóhàn) was recorded as wakening as from sleep to the 19th generation from Pangu-Adam (阿躭:Ādān), and grasping profound mysteries, founded Judaism. This is said to have occurred in the 146th year of the Zhou Dynasty (i.e., 977 BCE). The floruit of Moses (乜攝:Miēshè) in turn is set in the 613th year of the same dynasty, namely around 510 BCE.

In their prayers and liturgy, the traditional community followed Talmudic usage, celebrating all the Jewish festivals, observing the prayers, rituals and days of fasting variously associated with the Jewish Sabbath, Yom Kippur, Rosh Hashanah, Passover, Shavuot, Sukkot, Hanukkah, Purim and Tisha B'Av. Within a few centuries, nonetheless, practices regarding the coming of age ceremony, wedding and death and burial were acclimatized to the respective Chinese customs, though the text of the Kaddish in the Memorial Book suggests the prayer was recited at funerals. By sometime after the mid 19th century all of these practices appear to have been abandoned, including the observance of the Sabbath.

Outside the synagogue was a large hall, the Tz'u t'ang (祖堂:zǔ táng) or "Hall of the Ancestors" where, according to the Portuguese Jesuit Jean-Paul Gozani (1647–1732)  who lived in Kaifeng from 1698 to 1718, incense bowls were placed to commemorate the patriarchs and outstanding figures of the Law, as well as various holy men (聖人:shèngrén). This was similar to Chinese rites regarding ancestors, with the difference that no images were allowed. Their Pentateuch was divided into 53 sections according to the Persian style.

The Jesuits
The existence of Jews in China was unknown to Europeans until 1605, when Matteo Ricci, then established in Beijing, was visited by a Chinese official from Kaifeng. According to the account in De Christiana expeditione apud Sinas, Ricci's visitor, named Ai Tian, was a chüren (舉人:jǔrén) – someone who had passed the provincial level of a jìnshì degree  decades earlier in 1573. Ai Tian explained that he was a member of a 1,000 strong Israelite congregation that worshipped one God. They were unfamiliar with the word "Jew" (yóutài) which, according to Zhang Ligang, first appeared in the 1820s when a German missionary used this translated name of "Jews Country" in a journal. When he saw a Christian image of The Madonna, Mary with Jesus and John the Baptist, he took it to be a representation of Rebecca with her children Jacob and Esau.

Ai said that many other Jews resided in Kaifeng; they had a splendid synagogue, and possessed a great number of written materials and books. Ricci wrote that "his face was quite different to that of a Chinese in respect to his nose, his eyes, and all his features". This has been taken to allow an inference that, up to that time, the Kaifeng Jews had still largely shunned intermixing and were thus physically distinguishable from the surrounding population. About three years after Ai's visit, Ricci sent a Chinese Jesuit lay brother to visit Kaifeng; he copied the beginnings and ends of the holy books kept in the synagogue, which allowed Ricci to verify that they indeed were the same texts as the Pentateuch known to Europeans, except that they did not use Hebrew diacritics (which were a comparatively late invention).

When Ricci wrote to the "ruler of the synagogue" in Kaifeng, telling him that the Messiah the Jews were waiting for had come already, the  wrote back, saying that the Messiah would not come for another ten thousand years. Nonetheless, apparently concerned with the lack of a trained successor, the old rabbi offered Ricci his position, if the Jesuit would join their faith and abstain from eating pork. Later, another three Jews from Kaifeng, including Ai's nephew, stopped by the Jesuits' house while visiting Beijing on business, and got themselves baptized. They told Ricci that the old rabbi had died, and (since Ricci had not taken him up on his earlier offer), his position was inherited by his son, "quite unlearned in matters pertaining to his faith".  Ricci's overall impression of the situation of China's Jewish community was that "they were well on the way to becoming Saracens [i.e., Muslims] or heathens."

Father Joseph Brucker stated that Ricci's account of Chinese Jews indicated that there were only in the range of ten or twelve Jewish families in Kaifeng in the late 16th to early 17th centuries) In the Jesuits' manuscripts it was also stated that there was a greater number of Jews in Hangzhou.

19th to 20th centuries

From the 17th century, further assimilation had begun to erode these traditions as the rate of intermarriage between Jews and other ethnic groups such as the Han Chinese increased. With some Kaifeng families, Muslim men did marry their Jewish women, but the converse did not happen. In 1849, an observer who had contact with the Kaifeng Jewish community noted that "the Jews are quite Chinese in appearance." The Taiping Rebellion of the 1850s led to the dispersal of the community, but it later returned to Kaifeng.  To avoid the threat of becoming defunct, the Kaifeng community dispatched members to Shanghai in order to seek help from Sephardic European Jewish merchants active there. The funds that were collected to this end were diverted to assist an influx of Russian Jews fleeing pogroms.

Shanghai's Baghdadi Jewish community made attempts to assist Kaifeng Jews in returning to Judaism, accepting them, despite their pure Chinese features, as co-religionists. The firm of S. H. Sassoon took two Kaifeng brothers in flight from the Taiping rebels under their wing and had them sent to Bombay where they underwent circumcision. One died within two years but the other, Feba, was renamed Shalem Sholome David, and was employed by the Sassoons in their Shanghai office (1872-1882). In 1883 he married a Baghdadi Jewess, Habiba Reuben Moses, and became a respected member of the Jewish community in Bombay. During the Boxer rebellion the Bombay community offered to subsidize the relocation of Kaifeng Jews to Shanghai.

The dismantlement of the synagogue sometime between 1850 and 1866 led to the community's demise. By the turn of the 19-20th century members of the community had fallen into dire poverty. The Zhang Kaifeng Jewish family had largely converted to Islam by this time. The site of the synagogue had turned into a fetid swamp. Much material belonging to it, even the roof tiles, was purchased by Muslims and others: two young Kaifeng Jews sold three Torahs to two Americans and an Austrian. Some property was also said to have been stolen. The Ark of the Sefer Torah was reportedly seen in a mosque. The site itself was apparently bought by Bishop White in 1914, and in 1954, the Chinese Communist government confiscated the property and built the Kaifeng Municipal Clinic on it. Some usages remained. Burial coffins maintained a distinctive shape from those customary for Chinese.

Kaifeng Jewish ancestry has been found among their descendants living among the Hui Muslims. Scholars have pointed out that Hui Muslims may have absorbed Kaifeng Jews instead of Han Confucians and Buddhists. Kaifeng Chinese had difficulty in distinguishing Jews and Muslims, and spoke of the form as older Huihui/Muslims (回回古教: huíhuí gǔjiào). The blue hat Hui also referred to Jews converting to Islam.  Jin clan descendants also came to believe they were Muslims. Instead of being absorbed into Han, a portion of the Jews of China of Kaifeng became Hui Muslims. In 1948, Samuel Stupa Shih (Shi Hong Mo) (施洪模) said he saw a Hebrew language "Religion of Israel" Jewish inscription on a tombstone in a Qing dynasty Muslim cemetery to a place west of Hangzhou.

By Ricci's time, it is said that the Nanjing and Beijing Jews had become Muslims, though a Jewish community and synagogue still existed in Hangzhou.

Post-war times 
The Kaifeng Jews are not recognized as a minority among the 55 ethnic groups which have been granted this official status in China. Their bid to be so listed in 1953 was turned down by the Chinese government. Their registration as "Jewish descendants" (猶太後代:Yóutàihòudài ) was changed to Han Chinese (漢:Hàn) out of official concerns that an ethnic status might lead them to seek privileges. What little remains of their material Jewish heritage has been locked away by Chinese authorities in a special room in the Kaifeng museum, ostensibly for the protection of their heritage or is conserved in the Dongda mosque (東大寺:Dōngdàsì), where the relics are inaccessible. Family papers and heirlooms were reportedly discarded or burnt out of fear of the Red Guards during the Chinese Cultural Revolution.

In 1980 during a hajj pilgrimage the Hui Muslim woman Jin Xiaojing (金效靜) realized she had Jewish roots. The Portland Rabbi Joshua Stampfer (1921-2019), on a visit to Kaifeng in 1983, estimated there were from 100 to 150 descendants of Kaifeng Jews, and provided the means for Jin Xiaojing's daughter, Qu Yinan, then a Beijing journalist,  to study Judaism and Hebrew in California where she became the first of the Kaifeng community to be reconverted back to the religion of her ancestors. Qu Yinan's family abstained from certain foods, such as shellfish and pork, similar to the stipulations of kosher dietary law, which marked them off from most neighbouring Chinese. She had been under the impression her family was Muslim, who likewise abstain from pork, and her grandfather, like them, had worn a skullcap, only blue as opposed to the white cap worn donned by local Islamic believers.

Writing in 1987 Daniel Elazar suggested it would be difficult to maintain that contemporary Kaifeng Chinese of Jewish descent are Jews. Proposals to establish a Museum commemorating their history despite the city's lack of Jewish artifacts and documents, have received enthusiastic local government backing, which considers that such a centre would have positive effects on the local economy via Jewish tourism. Elazar opines that, over the ensuing decades, Western Jews will manage to encourage the growth of Chinese Jews among the descendant population The establishment of diplomatic relations between China and Israel in 1992 rekindled interest in Judaism and the Jewish experience.

It is difficult to estimate the number of Jews in China, population count often having to fluctuate constantly due to changes in official attitudes.  A survey in the 80s suggested 140 families in China bore six of the traditional Jewish surnames, with 79 in Kaifeng amounting to 166 individuals. The last official census revealed about 400 official Jews in Kaifeng, now estimated at some 100 families totalling approximately 500 people. Up to 1,000 residents have ties to Jewish ancestry, though only 40 to 50 individuals partake in Jewish activities.

Within the framework of contemporary rabbinic Judaism, matrilineal transmission of Jewishness is predominant, while Chinese Jews based their Jewishness on patrilineal descent. This has been attributed to the influence of Chinese cultural norms, where lines of descent are typically patrilineal). The Jewish sinologist Jordan Paper notes, however, that all genealogies in the Torah consist exclusively of male descent. The modern assumption that Judaism is matrilineal has been used, he adds, to deny the authenticity of Chinese Jews because their clan lineages were patrilineal.

Kaifeng Jews are not recognized as Jews by birth and are required to formally convert to Judaism in order to receive Israeli citizenship. Some desire to reconnect with Judaism and some say their parents and grandparents told them that they were Jewish and would one day "return to their land". Under Israel's Law of Return, aliyah requires proof of Jewish descent through at least one grandparent. Though such evidence is not available for the Kaifeng community, and strict Orthodox Jewish rabbis would question their authenticity as Jews, Shavei Israel's Michael Freund has sponsored for over a decade (2006-2016) the emigration of 19 descendants of Kaifeng Jews to Israel, where they have studied variously Hebrew in ulpanim and a yeshiva in preparation for conversion to Judaism.

In the 21st century, both the Sino-Judaic Institute and Shavei Israel sent teachers to Kaifeng to help interested community members learn about their Jewish heritage, building on the pioneering work of the American Judeo-Christian Timothy Lerner. Advocates for the descendants of the Kaifeng Jews are exploring ways to convince the Chinese authorities to recognize the antiquity of the Kaifeng Jews and allow them to practice their Chinese Jewish way of life.

Kaifeng manuscripts 

Several Kaifeng Torah scrolls survive, housed in collections in the British Library and elsewhere. A number of surviving written works are housed at Hebrew Union College's Klau Library in Cincinnati, Ohio. Among the works in that collection are a siddur (a Jewish prayer book) in Chinese characters and a Hebrew codex of the Bible. The codex is notable in that, while it ostensibly contains vowels, it was clearly copied by someone who did not understand them. While the symbols are accurate portrayals of Hebrew vowels, they appear to be placed randomly, thereby rendering the voweled text as gibberish. Since Modern Hebrew is generally written without vowels, a literate Hebrew speaker can disregard these markings, as the consonants are written correctly, with few scribal errors.

Also at the Klau Library is a haggadah from the 17th century and another from the 18th century, one written in Jewish-Persian hand, the other in Chinese Hebrew square script (like that of the Torah scrolls), using text primarily from an early stage of the Persian Jewish rite. A recent study of the text has a facsimile of one manuscript and a sample of the other, the full text of the Hebrew/Aramaic and Judeo-Persian haggadah (in Hebrew characters), as well as an annotated English translation.

Assessments 
Xun Zhou, a research fellow at SOAS expressed doubts about the authenticity of the Kaifeng community, arguing that it was a construct of Christian-driven Orientalism, powered by the evangelical interests of James Finn and his two works on the question: The Jews in China (1843)) and The Orphan Colony of Jews in China (1874). Finn relied on the accounts of the 17th century Jesuit missionaries. Zhou maintained that the community had no Torah scrolls until 1851, when they suddenly appeared to be sold to eager Western collectors. She also stated that drawings of the synagogue were doctored in the West because the original did not look like one, and that the Kaifeng community claimed to have kept some Jewish practices since before they are known to have begun. Xun Zhou posited that the Kaifeng community was not Jewish in any meaningful sense.  Her hypothesis has not found any support within the scholarly community.

In an overview of the place of Kaifeng Jews within the broader context of Jewish history, Simon Schama notes its exceptionality to the tragic diffidence of host societies to Jewish settlements:-
"To survey the predicament of Jews in much of the rest of the world is to marvel at what the Kaifeng community escaped. In China, Jews were not subjected to violence and persecution, not demonized as God killers. Their synagogues were not invaded by conversionary harangues. They were not physically segregated from non-Jews nor forced to wear humiliating forms of identification on their dress. They were not forced into the most despised and vulnerable occupations, not stigmatized as grasping and vindictive, and portrayed neither as predatory monsters nor pathetic victims."

Books and films

Literary references 
The American novelist Pearl S. Buck, raised in China and fluent in Chinese, set one of her historical novels (Peony) in a Chinese Jewish community. The novel deals with the cultural forces which are gradually eroding the separate identity of the Jews, including intermarriage. The title character, the Chinese bondmaid Peony, loves her master's son, David ben Ezra, but she cannot marry him due to her lowly status. He eventually marries a high-class Chinese woman, to the consternation of his mother, who is proud of her unmixed heritage. Descriptions of remnant names, such as a "Street of the Plucked Sinew", and descriptions of customs such as refraining from the eating of pork, are prevalent throughout the novel.

The Broadway musical Chu Chem is a fictional tale which revolves around the Kaifeng Jewish community. In the show, a group of European actors joins a troupe of Chinese performers in order to present the story of Chu Chem, a scholar who journeys to Kaifeng with his wife Rose and his daughter Lotte because he wants to learn about his ancestors and find a husband for Lotte.

Documentary films 
In his 1992 documentary series Legacy, writer Michael Wood traveled to Kaifeng and walked down a small lane known as the "alley of the sect who teach the Scriptures", that is, the alley of the Jews. He mentioned that there are still Jews in Kaifeng today, but they are reluctant to reveal themselves "in the current political climate". The documentary's companion book further states that one can still see a "mezuzah on the door frame, and the candelabrum in the living room". A recent documentary, Minyan in Kaifeng, covers the present-day Kaifeng Jewish community in China during a trip to Kaifeng which was taken by Jewish expatriates who met for weekly Friday night services in Beijing; upon learning about the Jews of Kaifeng, the members of the expatriate Jewish community decided to travel to Kaifeng in order to meet some of the descendants of the Kaifeng Jews and hold a Shabbat service.

See also 
 East Asian Jews
 History of the Jews in China
 Israelis in China

Notes

Citations

Sources

Further reading

External links 
 
 Sino-Judaic Institute
 Notes on The Jewish Colony at Kaifeng from the papers of Charles Daniel Tenney
 The Jewish Community of Kaifeng, The Museum of the Jewish People at Beit Hatfutsot

 
Chinese Jews
Crypto-Jews
East Asian Jews
Groups claiming Israelite descent
History of Kaifeng
Jewish Chinese history
Jewish ethnic groups